Tuza Maza Jamena is an Indian Marathi-language comedy television series which aired on Zee Marathi. It starred Manava Naik, Vaibhav Tatwawadi and Reema Lagoo in lead roles. It premiered from 13 May 2013 by replacing Ajunahi Chandraat Aahe.

Cast 
 Manava Naik as Manava Vaibhav Limaye
 Reema Lagoo as Reema Shridhar Limaye
 Vaibhav Tatwawadi as Vaibhav Shridhar Limaye
 Bhalchandra Kadam
 Shridhar Limaye
 Shriram Pendse
 Vidyadhar Joshi
 Abhijeet Kelkar
 Pournima Manohar
 Savita Malpekar
 Dipti Lele

References

External links 
 
 

Marathi-language television shows
Zee Marathi original programming
2013 Indian television series debuts
2013 Indian television series endings